Millennium Project may refer to:
 United Nations Millennium Project, a development initiative
 The Millennium Project, an independent non-profit think tank composed of futurists

See also
 Millennium Mathematics Project, a joint project between the Faculties of Mathematics and Education within the University of Cambridge
 Millennium Seed Bank Partnership, an international conservation project
 Millennium Villages Project, a non-profit organization